This is a list of episodes from the British comedy panel game television show You Have Been Watching!. As of 4 August 2010, sixteen episodes have been aired across two series on Channel 4 and E4.

Series overview

Episodes

Pilot

Series 1

Series 2

Footnotes

References

External links
 
 
 

Lists of British comedy television series episodes
Lists of British non-fiction television series episodes